Ernst Müller-Hermann (September 30, 1915 – July 19, 1994) was a German politician of the Christian Democratic Union (CDU) and former member of the German Bundestag.

Life 
He became a member of the CDU as early as 1946. From 1946 to 1948, he was state managing director, and from 1968 to 1974 he was state chairman of the Bremen CDU.

From 1946 to 1952, Müller-Hermann was a member of the Bremen State Parliament and from 1950 to 1952 Chairman of the CDU parliamentary group.

He was a member of the German Bundestag from January 1, 1952, when he succeeded Johannes Degener, until 1980. He was elected to parliament in all electoral periods via the CDU's Bremen national list. From 1957 to 1965 he was Deputy Chairman of the Bundestag Committee on Transport, Post and Telecommunications, and from 1965 to 1969 of the Transport Committee. From 13 June 1967 to 1969 he was Deputy Chairman of the CDU/CSU parliamentary group in the Bundestag and from 1969 to 1976 Chairman of the Economics and Food Working Group of the CDU/CSU parliamentary group.

He was a member of the European Parliament from 27 February 1958 to 21 December 1965 and from 19 January 1977 to 1984.

Literature

References

1915 births
1994 deaths
Members of the Bundestag for Bremen
Members of the Bundestag 1976–1980
Members of the Bundestag 1972–1976
Members of the Bundestag 1969–1972
Members of the Bundestag 1965–1969
Members of the Bundestag 1961–1965
Members of the Bundestag 1957–1961
Members of the Bundestag 1953–1957
Members of the Bundestag 1949–1953
Members of the Bundestag for the Christian Democratic Union of Germany
Christian Democratic Union of Germany MEPs
MEPs for Germany 1958–1979
MEPs for Germany 1979–1984
Members of the Bürgerschaft of Bremen